Erastus C. Smith was an American legislator from the Town of Spring Valley, Wisconsin. Smith served a single one-year term in the Wisconsin State Assembly in 1850 as a member of the Free Soil Party. He served the district that included the Towns of Avon, Center, Newark, Rock, and Spring Valley in Rock County, Wisconsin. He was assigned to the standing committees on privileges and elections; and on expiration and enactment of laws.

References 

Smith, E. C. (Spring Valley)
People from Spring Valley (town), Wisconsin
Wisconsin Free Soilers
19th-century American politicians
Year of birth unknown
Year of death unknown